Peronospora dianthicola is a plant pathogen. It causes downy mildew on leaves of carnation (Dianthus caryophyllus). The disease is of minor importance, whether in commercial production or gardens. If necessary, it can be controlled by foliar sprays of fungicides.

References

External links

Water mould plant pathogens and diseases
Ornamental plant pathogens and diseases
Peronosporales
Species described in 1953